Thelma Mothershed-Wair (born November 29, 1940) is the eldest member of the Little Rock Nine group who attended Little Rock's Central High School following the 1954 Brown vs. Board of Education court case. The Little Rock Nine was a group of nine African American students enrolled in Little Rock Central High School in 1957. Their enrollment was followed by the Little Rock Crisis, in which the students were initially prevented from entering the racially segregated school by Orval Faubus, the Governor of Arkansas. They then attended after the intervention of President Dwight D. Eisenhower.

Childhood
Wair was born in Bloomburg, Texas and is the daughter of Arlevia and Hosanna Claire Mothershed of Little Rock, Arkansas. Mothershed had five siblings other than herself, three sisters and two brothers. She attended Dunbar Junior High and Horace Mann High schools, and despite daily torment from white students at Little Rock Central High School, she completed her junior year at the formerly all-white high school during the tumultuous 1957–58 year. She was a very successful student, and was able to graduate from Central High in the 1958–59 school year after going out of her way to complete all the necessary credits in order to graduate on time.

Little Rock Nine
The Little Rock Nine were a group of African American students who began the integration, or the desegregation, of all white schools in Little Rock, Arkansas. This group of brave students were tormented, ridiculed, harassed, and even assaulted daily for simply attending what would now be considered a regular public school. The governor of Little Rock, at the time, was Orval Faubus, and he set up military guards to escort these nine students to and from school, as well as between classes. In an attempt to halt the desegregation of this school, a 'lost year' had occurred, leaving some students stranded unless they were able to take extra courses (like Mothershed did). This did not work, however, and a couple of the Little Rock Nine were still able to obtain their high school diplomas from this once all white school. These original nine students eventually led to the desegregation of all public schools in the area.

School
Due to Little Rock's schools being closed the year following the Little Rock Nine students' integration, in order to earn the necessary credits for graduation she took correspondence courses and attended summer school in St. Louis, Missouri. She received her diploma from Central High School by mail. Wair graduated from Southern Illinois University Carbondale in 1964 and earned her master's degree in Guidance and Counseling and an Administrative Certificate in Education from Southern Illinois University Edwardsville in 1970 and 1972, respectively. Wair taught home economics in the East St. Louis School System for 28 years before retiring in 1994. She has been known as the leader of the Little Rock Nine. In 1958, she received the Spingarn Medal from the National Association for the Advancement of Colored People (NAACP) for outstanding achievement. In 1998, Mothershed-Wair received the Congressional Gold Medal.

After Little Rock Nine
Since receiving her degrees, Mothershed has worked at the St. Clair County Jail, Juvenile Detention Center in St. Clair County, Illinois, and as an Instructor of Survival Skills for Women at the American Red Cross Second Chance Shelter for the Homeless. During the 1989–90 school year she was honored as an Outstanding Role Model by the East St. Louis Chapter of the Top Ladies of Distinction and the Early Childhood-Pre Kindergarten staff of District 189. She also received the National Humanitarian Award, the highest award given at the 2005 National Convention of Top Ladies of Distinction, Inc. held in Chicago. Wair and her late husband have one son. In 2003 she moved back to the Little Rock area. She received an Honorary Doctor of Humane Letters from Southern Illinois University Edwardsville in 2016. on the Carbondale campus. Before earning her honorary degree, Mothershed-Wair had earned her bachelor's degree in home economics from SIU in 1964, completed her master's in guidance and counselling with SIUE in 1970 and achieved an administrative certificate in education from this same university in 1972. “Ms. Wair exemplifies and lives SIUE’s values of wisdom, citizenship, integrity, excellence and inclusion,” SIUE Interim Chancellor Stephen Hansen said. “While SIUE provided her with an education, she in turn taught all of us about courage, justice and dignity.”She showed us she was a true hero.

Family
Thelma Mothershed married Fred Wair on December 26, 1965, and became Thelma Mothershed-Wair. Fred Wair was born on October 6, 1939, and died at age 65 on Wednesday, May 25, 2005, at the River Bluffs Rehab and Nursing Center in Cahokia, Illinois. Thelma and Fred had a single son, Scott Wair. Currently there are no records available on Scott. Scott Wair had two children, Brennan Dallas and Gabriel Scott.
Mothershed-Wair currently resides peacefully in her hometown of Little Rock.

Notes

External links
 .
 .

1940 births
Living people
Little Rock Nine
Congressional Gold Medal recipients
Activists from Little Rock, Arkansas
People from Cass County, Texas
Spingarn Medal winners
Activists from Texas